Cian O'Connor (born 12 November 1979) is an Irish equestrian who competes in show jumping. He has competed at three Olympic Games, four World Championships and six European Championships, and has attained 133 senior caps for his country. He won an individual bronze medal at the London Olympic Games 2012 and was a member of the Irish team that took a gold medal at the European Championships in Gothenburg in 2017. O’Connor also won a bronze individual medal at the latter event. At the Tokyo Summer Olympics (which was held in 2021), Cian and his Irish-bred mount Susan Magnier’s Irish bred Kilkenny finished seventh in the individual class.

Cian was also a member of the Irish Teams that won Aga Khan Trophy at the Dublin Horse show in 2004, 2012, 2015 and 2022, which he most recently participated in alongside his pupil Max Wachman.

O’Connor was also a member of the winning Irish team at the European Show Jumping Championships in 2017, again after a 16-year absence from the podium by Ireland. He also took an individual bronze medal at these championships.

Aside from his own participation in the sport, O’Connor has also carved out a significant reputation as a coach to an outstanding crop of younger riders across Ireland, North America and beyond who continue to compete at the highest level of showjumping, both nationally and internationally.

O’Connor also specialises in producing younger horses to achieve top international standards and has a reputation for being able to identify horses with such potential, often early in their careers.

Recently, he was part of the Irish World Championships team in Herning 2022, where they secured the qualification for the Paris Olympic Games in 2024.

Major results 

2020 Summer Olympics

Placed seventh Individual in Tokyo 2020 Olympics (celebrated in 2021) with his horse Kilkenny.

2012 Summer OlympicsWon the bronze medal in London with his horse Blue Loyd 12 in individual jumping. He lost to Gerco Schröder of the Netherlands in a Silver medal jump-off.2004 Summer OlympicsRiding his horse, Waterford Crystal, he became an instant national hero, being the only Irish medalist that year. However, on 8 October 2004, it emerged that Waterford Crystal had tested positive for a prohibited substance. The Federation Equestre Internationale (FEI) ruled that O'Connor must be stripped of his medal and he also received a three-month ban from competition. FEI found that he did not deliberately attempt to affect the performance of the horse. The individual showjumping gold medal went to Brazilian Rodrigo Pessoa and the Irish team's seventh place was inherited by the Italians.

Horses 
Kilkenny

(01/05/2012) Gelding, Grey. Irish Sport Horse (Cardento 933 x Guidam)
 
Taj Mahal 

(11/05/2013) Stallion, Bay. Zangersheide (Emerald Van'T Ruytershof x Quannan R)

C Vier 2 

(22/05/2008) Gelding, Bay. Holsteiner (Cardento 933 x Concorde)

Good Luck 

(15/05/2006) Stallion, Bay. Belgian Warmblood (Canturo x Furioso II)

Blue Lloyd 12 
(11/02/2000) Gelding, Bay. Oldenburger (Landor S x Hadj A X)

Splendor 

(31/05/1999) Gelding, Chestnut. Dutch Warmblood (Lester x Marinier)

K Club Lady 

(08/03/1999) Mare, Bay. Holsteiner (Calido x Landgraf I)

Arabella 
 
(05/05/2003) Mare, Bay. Irish Sport Horse (Heartbreaker x Cavalier Royale) 

Larkhill Cruiser

(20/03/2001) Gelding, Chestnut. Irish Sport Horse (Cruising x Crosstown Dancer)

Rancorrado 

(06/04/1998) Gelding, Bay. Dutch Warmblood (Gran Corrado x Hamlet)

Echo Beach 

(23/05/2007) Stallion, Bay. Anglo European (Unbelievable Darco x Goodtimes)

Waterford Crystal 

(06/03/1991) Gelding, Bay. Holsteiner (Landgraf I x Corvado)

References

External links

 
 
 
 
 

1979 births
Living people
Equestrians at the 2004 Summer Olympics
Equestrians at the 2012 Summer Olympics
Irish show jumping riders
Irish sportspeople in doping cases
Olympic equestrians of Ireland
Irish male equestrians
Olympic bronze medalists for Ireland
Sportspeople from Dublin (city)
Competitors stripped of Summer Olympics medals
Olympic medalists in equestrian
Medalists at the 2012 Summer Olympics
People educated at Belvedere College
Equestrians at the 2020 Summer Olympics